Anwon of Goguryeo (died 545) (r. 531–545) was the 23rd ruler of Goguryeo, the northernmost of the Three Kingdoms of Korea.  He was the younger brother of Anjang of Goguryeo, and is said to have been tall and wise.

Battles
The other two of the Three Kingdoms, Baekje and Silla, formed an alliance in response to the Goguryeo threat, leading to a relatively balanced peace. In the only conflict during Anwon's reign, in the ninth lunar month of 540, Baekje laid siege to Usan Castle, but Anwon sent 5,000 cavalry and drove the attackers off.

Disasters
Goguryeo suffered many natural disasters during Anwon's reign, such as flooding in the south of his kingdom, earthquakes, thunderstorms and a severe epidemic, a severe drought(in his 6th year of reign. He had yo help the people because of the incident), a plague of locusts.However, he attempted to salvage starving people from hunger during the 7th year of his reign during the spring.

Chaos around succession and death
Anwon's first queen had not given birth to a son.  In his third year on the throne, he had designated as crown prince his eldest son by his second queen, prince Pyeongseong (subsequent king Yangwon). However, in the last year of Anwon's reign, there was a power struggle between his second and third queens who each sought to make her son the crown prince.

The aristocracy split into two camps, leading to violent battles during which the king was apparently killed.  This internal division was the beginning of a significantly weakening of the royal throne and Goguryeo itself in subsequent years.

The king died in the third lunar month of 545, after 15 years on the throne. He was given the posthumous royal title of King Anwŏn.

Foreign relations
The king paid tribute to  Northern Wei Liang dynasty and Eastern Wei.

Family
Father: King Munja (문자명왕, 文咨明王)
Grandfather: Prince Joda/Juda (조다, 助多)
Consorts and their respective issue(s):
Center Lady (정부인, 正夫人) – No issue.
Middle Lady (중부인, 中夫人)
Prince Pyeongseong (평성, 平成)
Little Lady (소부인, 小夫人)
Unknown son

See also
History of Korea
Three Kingdoms of Korea
List of Korean monarchs

References

Goguryeo rulers
545 deaths
6th-century monarchs in Asia
Year of birth unknown
6th-century Korean people